The 2007 Malaysia Open Super Series (officially known as the Proton Malaysia Super Series 2007 for sponsorship reasons) was a badminton tournament which took place at Kuala Lumpur Badminton Stadium in Kuala Lumpur, Malaysia, from 16 to 21 January 2007 and had a total purse of $200,000.

Tournament 
The 2007 Malaysia Open Super Series was the inaugural tournament of the 2007 BWF Super Series and also part of the Malaysia Open championships, which had been held since 1937.

Venue 
This international tournament was held at Kuala Lumpur Badminton Stadium in Kuala Lumpur, Malaysia.

Point distribution 
Below is the point distribution for each phase of the tournament based on the BWF points system for the BWF Super Series event.

Prize money 
The total prize money for this tournament was US$200,000. Distribution of prize money was in accordance with BWF regulations.

Men's singles

Seeds 

 Lin Dan (second round)
 Lee Chong Wei (quarter-finals)
 Chen Hong (semi-finals)
 Peter Gade (champion)
 Bao Chunlai (final)
 Chen Jin (quarter-finals)
 Chen Yu (quarter-finals)
 Kenneth Jonassen (semi-finals)

Finals

Top half

Section 1

Section 2

Bottom half

Section 3

Section 4

Women's singles

Seeds 

 Zhang Ning (withdrew)
 Xie Xingfang (withdrew)
 Wang Chen (withdrew)
 Huaiwen Xu (quarter-finals)
 Lu Lan (second round)
 Pi Hongyan (first round)
 Yao Jie (semi-finals)
 Zhu Lin (champion)

Finals

Top half

Section 1

Section 2

Bottom half

Section 3

Section 4

Men's doubles

Seeds 

 Fu Haifeng / Cai Yun (second round)
 Jens Eriksen / Martin Lundgaard Hansen (quarter-finals)
 Choong Tan Fook / Lee Wan Wah (first round)
 Jung Jae-sung / Lee Yong-dae (semi-finals)
 Anthony Clark / Robert Blair (quarter-finals)
 Tony Gunawan /  Candra Wijaya (final)
 Markis Kido / Hendra Setiawan (semi-finals)
 Mohd Fairuzizuan Mohd Tazari / Robert Lin Woon Fui (second round)

Finals

Top half

Section 1

Section 2

Bottom half

Section 3

Section 4

Women's doubles

Seeds 

 Gao Ling / Huang Sui (champions)
 Yang Wei / Zhang Jiewen (quarter-finals)
 Wong Pei Tty / Chin Eei Hui (first round)
 Zhang Yawen / Wei Yili (withdrew)
 Du Jing / Zhao Tingting (quarter-finals)
 Gail Emms / Donna Kellogg (first round)
 Jiang Yanmei / Li Yujia (quarter-finals)
 Endang Nursugianti / Rani Mundiasti (quarter-finals)

Finals

Top half

Section 1

Section 2

Bottom half

Section 3

Section 4

Mixed doubles

Seeds 

 Nova Widianto / Liliyana Natsir (semi-finals)
 Sudket Prapakamol / Saralee Thungthongkam (second round)
 Anthony Clark / Donna Kellogg (second round)
 Xie Zhongbo / Zhang Yawen (withdrew)
 Nathan Robertson / Gail Emms (final)
 Zheng Bo / Gao Ling (champions)
 Thomas Laybourn / Kamilla Rytter Juhl (quarter-finals)
 Zhang Jun / Zhao Tingting (quarter-finals)

Finals

Top half

Section 1

Section 2

Bottom half

Section 3

Section 4

References

External links 
Tournament Link

Malaysia Open (badminton)
Sport in Kuala Lumpur
2007 in Malaysian sport
Malaysia